The 2000 Internationaux de Strasbourg was a women's tennis tournament played on outdoor clay courts. It was the 14th edition of the Internationaux de Strasbourg, and was part of the Tier III Series of the 2000 WTA Tour. The tournament took place at the Centre Sportif de Hautepierre in Strasbourg, France, from 22 May until 27 May 2000. Sixth-seeded Silvija Talaja won the singles title and earned $27,000 first-prize money.

Finals

Singles

 Silvija Talaja defeated  Rita Kuti-Kis 7–5, 4–6, 6–3
 It was Talaja's second singles title of the year.

Doubles

 Sonya Jeyaseelan /  Florencia Labat defeated  Kim Grant /  María Vento 6–4, 6–3

References

External links
 ITF tournament edition details 
 Tournament draws

2000 WTA Tour
2000
Internationaux de Strasbourg
May 2000 sports events in Europe